Dagrocorat (developmental code names PF-00251802, PF-251802) is a nonsteroidal but steroid-like selective glucocorticoid receptor modulator (SGRM) which was under development for the treatment of rheumatoid arthritis but was never marketed. It is described as a partial agonist and "dissociable" agonist of the glucocorticoid receptor. The drug reached phase I clinical trials prior to the discontinuation of its development. The C2α dihydrogen phosphate ester of dagrocorat, fosdagrocorat, was also under investigation, but its development was terminated as well.

See also
 AZD-5423
 Mapracorat
 Fosdagrocorat

References

External links
 Dagrocorat - AdisInsight

Anti-inflammatory agents
Carboxamides
Glucocorticoids
Phenanthrenes
Phenyl compounds
Pyridines
Selective glucocorticoid receptor modulators
Trifluoromethyl compounds